Lord Marks  may refer to:

George Croydon Marks, 1st Baron Marks (1858-1938)
Simon Marks, 1st Baron Marks of Broughton (1888-1964)
Jonathan Marks, Baron Marks of Henley-on-Thames (born 1952)